Elisabet Kjellberg (3 October 1821 – 29 November 1914) was a Swedish publicist, editor and author.

Gustafva Elisabet Kjellberg  was born at Tösse in Dalsland, Sweden. She moved to Uppsala in the 1870s. In 1896 she moved to Djursholm where she died during 1914.

Kjellberg published the literary magazine  from 1879–1904.  It mainly contained biographies of Swedish culture personalities and authors, often her friends and mostly written by herself.  The magazine also included contributions  by contemporary Swedish authors.  The most noted biography from the magazine was that of Swedish lecturer i Pontus Wikner (1837–1888).

References

1821 births
1914 deaths
People from Dalsland
Swedish editors
Swedish women editors
19th-century journalists
Swedish women journalists
Swedish newspaper editors
19th-century Swedish businesspeople
Swedish newspaper publishers (people)
19th-century publishers (people)
19th-century newspaper publishers (people)
19th-century Swedish businesswomen